Arona Sané (born 21 June 1995) is a Senegalese professional footballer who plays for Spanish club Alondras CF as a right winger.

Club career
Born in Sindia, Sané joined Atlético Madrid's youth setup in 2009 at the age of 14, from ASC Jamoral. He made his senior debut for the C-team in the 2013–14 campaign, in Tercera División.

Sané was promoted to the reserves ahead of the 2015–16 campaign, with the side now also in the fourth level. He helped the club in their promotion to Segunda División B in 2017, but suffered a knee injury during the final match of the play-offs.

Sané made his first team – and La Liga – debut on 6 May 2018, coming on as a first-half substitute for injured Vitolo in a 0–2 home loss against RCD Espanyol.

References

External links

1995 births
Living people
People from Thiès Region
Senegalese footballers
Association football wingers
La Liga players
Segunda División B players
Tercera División players
Atlético Madrid C players
Atlético Madrid B players
Atlético Madrid footballers
Croatian Football League players
NK Istra 1961 players
Senegalese expatriate footballers
Senegalese expatriate sportspeople in Spain
Expatriate footballers in Spain
Expatriate footballers in Croatia
Senegalese expatriate sportspeople in Croatia